Irina Danilova (born 17 December 1993) is a Kazakhstani handball player who plays for the club Almaty Handball. She is member of the Kazakhstani national team. She competed at the 2015 World Women's Handball Championship in Denmark.

References

1993 births
Living people
Kazakhstani female handball players
Handball players at the 2010 Summer Youth Olympics
Handball players at the 2014 Asian Games
Handball players at the 2018 Asian Games
Asian Games bronze medalists for Kazakhstan
Asian Games medalists in handball
Medalists at the 2014 Asian Games
21st-century Kazakhstani women
20th-century Kazakhstani women